Bruce O. Riedel (born 1953) is an American expert on U.S. security, South Asia, and counter-terrorism. He is currently a senior fellow in the Saban Center for Middle East Policy at the Brookings Institution, and a professor at Johns Hopkins School of Advanced International Studies. He also serves as a senior adviser at Albright Stonebridge Group.

Riedel, a  former Central Intelligence Agency (CIA) analyst and counter-terrorism expert, served in the Agency for 29 years until his retirement in 2006. He has advised four presidents on Middle East and South Asian issues in the White House on the staff of the National Security Council (NSC).

He is a contributor to several periodicals and an author of books examining topics related to his areas of expertise — counter-terrorism, Arab-Israeli relations, Persian Gulf security, and South Asia, especially India and Pakistan.

Biography

Youth and education
Riedel was born in 1953 in Queens, New York. He was just a year old when his father — a political adviser at the United Nations — moved his family to Jerusalem and later to Beirut. After much travel, Riedel obtained a B.A. (1975, Brown University) in Middle East history and an MA (1977, Harvard) in Medieval Islamic history. From 2002 to 2003, he attended the Royal College of Defence Studies in London.

Career
CIA years : 1977 – 2006
In 1977, Riedel began a career as an analyst for the CIA, where he spent most of his professional life. After serving 29 years, he retired in 2006.

During his tenure at the CIA he held several positions, including:
 Various assignments, Central Intelligence Agency (1977–1990)
 Deputy Chief Persian Gulf Task Force, Central Intelligence Agency (1990–1991)
 Director for Gulf and South Asia Affairs, National Security Council (1991–1993)
 National Intelligence Officer for Near East and South Asian Affairs at the National Intelligence Council (1993–95)
 Deputy Assistant Secretary of Defense for Near East and South Asian Affairs, Office of the Secretary of Defense (1995–1997)
 Special Assistant to the President, and Senior Director for Near East Affairs on the National Security Council (1997–2001)
 Special Assistant to the President and Senior Director for Near East and North African Affairs, National Security Council (2001–2002)
 Member, Royal College of Defence Studies, London, UK (2002–2003)
 Special Advisor, NATO, Brussels, Belgium (2003–2006)

2006 – to present
Riedel is currently a senior fellow in the Saban Center for Middle East Policy at the Brookings Institution, and a professor at Georgetown University School of Foreign Service. He also serves as a senior adviser at Albright Stonebridge Group.

Riedel was a policy adviser to the 2008 presidential campaign of Barack Obama. In February 2009, Obama appointed him chair of a White House review committee formed to overhaul U.S. policy on Afghanistan and Pakistan.

In 2011, he served as an expert advisor to the prosecution of al Qaeda terrorist Omar Farooq Abdulmutallab in Detroit. In December 2011, Prime Minister David Cameron asked him to advise the UK's National Security Council on Pakistan.

In a February 2013 article published on the website of the Brookings Institution, Riedel discussed "false flag ops" in relation to Algerian counter-terrorism units. In his article "Algeria a Complex Ally in War Against al Qaeda", he described the Algerian counter-terrorism unit DRS and its methods:
"(The) DRS is (…) known for its tactic of infiltrating terrorist groups, creating “false flag” terrorists and trying to control them.", Riedel writes. "Rumors have associated the DRS in the past with the Malian warlord Iyad Ag Ghali, head of Ansar al Dine AQIM’s ally in Mali, and even with Mukhtar Belmukhtar, the al-Qaeda terrorist who engineered the attack on the natural gas plant."

On 14 February 2012, in an article for American news website The Daily Beast, Riedel quoted former ISI chief, Gen. (retired) Ziauddin Khwaja, as saying that former Pakistani President Pervez Musharraf "knew  bin Laden was in Abbottabad".

Honors
Secretary of Defense Distinguished Service Medal (1997)
Distinguished Intelligence Medal (2001)
Department of State Meritorious Honor Award (2006), for work in the intelligence and defense communities

Publications
Riedel is a contributor to several journals and magazines; and an author of several books.

Which Path to Persia: Options for a New American Strategy Toward Iran, (Brookings Institution Press, June 2009)
Al Qaeda Strikes Back, (Brookings Institution Press, May/June 2007)

Reception

Avoiding Armageddon: America, India, and Pakistan to the Brink and Back
In the words of reviewer Francesca Silvestri, Bruce Riedel is the most qualified person to deliver a clear picture of American foreign policy in South Asia. Silvestri cites Riedel's extensive research and experience which help in making his book, Avoiding Armageddon: America, India, and Pakistan to the Brink and Back, "one of the most accurate and interesting analyses of the tangled relationship between Washington, New Delhi and Islamabad." Silvestri sees this book as of interest to scholars of South Asia and young students as well as researchers. Roman Chestnov calls it a "comprehensible" and "concise" study of the relationship between India, Pakistan and the United States.

Personal life
Riedel is married and lives in the US. His wife, whom he met at the CIA, continues to work at the agency as a Middle East analyst.

References

External links

Al Qaeda Strikes Back by Bruce Riedel, Foreign Affairs, May/June 2007
A New Pakistan Policy: Containment by Riedel, The New York Times, October 15, 2011

1953 births
American male writers
American political scientists
Brown University alumni
Experts on terrorism
Harvard University alumni
International security
Johns Hopkins University faculty
Living people
Peace and conflict scholars
People of the Central Intelligence Agency
Terrorism theorists
Writers about Pakistan
Writers on the Middle East
Brookings Institution people